Neozoanthus is a genus of corals belonging to the monotypic family Neozoanthidae.

The species of this genus are found in Southern Africa, Australia.

Species:

Neozoanthus caleyi 
Neozoanthus tulearensis 
Neozoanthus uchina

References

Brachycnemina
Hexacorallia genera